The 1995 Grand Prix Passing Shot, also known as the Bordeaux Open, was a men's tennis tournament played on outdoor hard courts at Villa Primrose in Bordeaux, France that was part of the World Series of the 1995 ATP Tour. It was the 18th and last edition of the tournament and was held from 11 September until 17 September 1995. Second-seeded Yahiya Doumbia won the singles title.

Finals

Singles
 Yahiya Doumbia defeated  Jakob Hlasek 	6–4, 6–4
 It was Doumbia's 1st singles title of the year and 2nd of his career.

Doubles
 Sasa Hirszon /  Goran Ivanišević defeated  Henrik Holm /  Danny Sapsford 6–3, 6–4

References

External links
 ITF tournament edition details

Grand Prix Passing Shot
ATP Bordeaux
Grand Prix Passing Shot
Grand Prix Passing Shot